Rick Swan is a game designer and author who worked for TSR.
His work for TSR, mostly for Advanced Dungeons & Dragons, appeared from 1989 to 1995.

Swan also wrote The Complete Guide to Role-Playing Games (1990), published by St. Martin's Press. He was a regular columnist for InQuest Gamer.

Publications
"Monstrous Compendium: Dragonlance Appendix", 1989
"Monstrous Compendium: Kara-Tur Appendix", 1990
"The Complete Wizard's Handbook", 1990
"Marvel Super Heroes The Uncanny X-MEN Adventure Book", 1990
"The Complete Ranger's Handbook", 1993
"The Complete Paladin's Handbook", 1994
"The Complete Barbarian's Handbook", 1995
"The Complete Book of Villains", 1994
"In the Cage: A Guide to Sigil", 1995 (with Wolfgang Baur)
"The Great Glacier", 1992
"Nightmare Keep (Advanced Dungeons & Dragons/Forgotten Realms module FA2)", 1990
"Dragon Magic", 1989
"The Complete Guide to Role-Playing Games", 1990
"The Heart of the Enemy", 1992
"Ronin Challenge (Advanced Dungeons and Dragons/Forgotten Realms/Oriental Adventures Module OA6)", 1990 (With Curtis Smith)
"In Search of Dragons (AD&D/Dragonlance Module DLE1)", 1989
"Caravans", 1990

See also
Dungeons & Dragons

References

External links

American male writers
Dungeons & Dragons game designers
Living people
Year of birth missing (living people)